Filthy Rich is a 2009 original graphic novel written by Brian Azzarello. It was one of two books to launch Vertigo's Vertigo Crime line along with Ian Rankin's Dark Entries. The interior art was created by Victor Santos and cover was done by Lee Bermejo.

Plot
The story centres on Richard "Junk" Junkin, a former professional football star whose career was prematurely ended by injury and who now is employed as a car salesman. When Junk’s boss at the car showroom asks him to become his daughter’s personal bodyguard during her nights out on the New York club scene he cannot believe his luck. Junk has been lusting after his boss’s daughter for a long-time and sees this as an excellent opportunity get close to her. But Junk soon realises that his boss’s daughter, Victoria wants a lot more than just a bodyguard and she will use all her power over Junk and her money to make sure he does exactly what she wants, including murder.

Release details
 Filthy Rich (by Brian Azzarello and Victor Santos, 200 pages, Vertigo, August 2009)

Notes

References

External links
Filthy Rich at DC Comics.com
 Crime Scene NI Review

2009 comics debuts
2009 graphic novels
Crime comics
Horror comics
Vertigo Comics graphic novels
Comics by Brian Azzarello